Kwang-ho is a Korean masculine given name. The meaning differs based on the hanja used to write each syllable of the name. There are 13 hanja with the reading "kwang" and 49 hanja with the reading "ho" on the South Korean government's official list of hanja which may be used in given names.

People with this name include:
Jo Kwanwoo (born 1965 as Jo Kwangho), South Korean singer
Cui Guanghao (born 1979), Chinese football player of Korean descent
Hong Kwang-ho (born 1982), South Korean musical theatre actor
Kim Kwang-ho (born 1988), North Korean ice hockey player, captain of the North Korea men's national ice hockey team
Shin Kwangho, South Korean artist
Jeong Gwang-ho, South Korean politician; see List of members of the South Korean Constituent Assembly, 1948–1950
Byeon Gwang-ho, South Korean politician; see List of members of the National Assembly (South Korea), 1950–1954
Chon Kwang-ho, North Korean politician; see 2014 North Korean parliamentary election

Fictional characters with this name include:
Kim Kwang-ho, character in 2005 South Korean film Bravo, My Life

See also
List of Korean given names

References

Korean masculine given names